Every Home Should Have One is a 1970 British comedy film directed by Jim Clark and starring Marty Feldman. It was released in the United States in theatres and on home video under the title Think Dirty.

The overall concept is in direct ridicule of the then ongoing campaign by Mary Whitehouse on gratuitous sex in advertising and other fields. Certain sections such as the parish council watching entire programmes by which they are offended by to count the offensive incidents, parodies Mary Whitehouse's infamous behaviour of the time.

Plot 
An advertising man is assigned by his boss to come up with a sexy new image for Mrs McLaughlin's Frozen Porridge. While his wife runs a clean-up-TV campaign organized by the local vicar, he has an affair with the au-pair girl.

The overall concept is that adverts play out before their lives connecting to the products to hand.

The various porridge advertising campaigns get more and more extreme: the most relevant being the Goldilocks and the Three Bears campaign. This leads to a secondary campaign to search for "Miss Goldilocks".

Cast 

 Marty Feldman as Teddy Brown
 Judy Cornwell as Liz Brown
 Garry Miller as Richard Brown, their son
 Shelley Berman as Nat Kaplan
 Hy Hazell as Mrs. Kaplan
 Julie Ege as Inga Giltenburg
 Penelope Keith as Lotte von Gelbstein
 Moray Watson as Chandler
 Jack Watson as McLaughlin
 Mark Elwes as Rokes
 Harold Innocent as Jimpson
 Dinsdale Landen as Reverend Geoffrey Mellish
 John McKelvey as Colonel Belper
 Charles Lewsen as Arthur Soames
 Maggie Jones as Hetty Soames
 Frances de la Tour as Maude Crape
 Patrick Cargill as Wallace Trufitt, MP
 Patience Collier as Mrs. Monty Levin
 Annabel Leventon as Chandler's secretary
 Sarah Badel as Joanna Snow
 John Wells as Tolworth
 Michael Bates as Magistrate
 Dave Dee as Wednesday Play Star
 Judy Huxtable as Frankenstein Heroine

Production 
The film's titles and animated sequences were provided by Richard Williams.

Filming
The film was produced at Shepperton Studios in England.

Music
The feature's theme song, "Every Home Should Have One", was written by John Cameron, Caryl Brahms, and Ned Sherrin, arranged by Alan Tew, produced by Jackie Rand, and sung by Millicent Martin. The song was released as a single to promote the film.

Reception
The film was one of the most popular movies in 1970 at the British box office.

However according to Sidney Gilliat who was on the board at British Lion, the film lost money

References

External links

1970 films
Films about advertising
1970 comedy films
British comedy films
British Lion Films films
Films scored by John Cameron
Films set in London
Films shot at Shepperton Studios
1970s English-language films
1970s British films